Ed Gass-Donnelly (born August 17, 1977) is a Canadian film director, screenwriter and producer. His first full-length film, This Beautiful City, was released in 2008 and nominated for four Genies at the 29th Genie Awards. In January 2011 Gass-Donnelly was selected as one of the top ten film makers to watch by Variety.

Filmography

References

External links
 

1977 births
Canadian male screenwriters
Film directors from Toronto
Living people
Writers from Toronto